A Christmas Story 2 is a 2012 American Christmas comedy film directed by Brian Levant and starring Daniel Stern and Braeden Lemasters. The film is a direct sequel to the 1983 film A Christmas Story and ignores the events of the 1994 film My Summer Story. The film, set six years after the original, follows fifteen-year-old Ralphie as he wishes for a 1939 Mercury Eight convertible for Christmas, but crashes the car before he even owns it. Now, Ralphie and his friends (Flick and Schwartz) must find a way to raise enough money to fix the car before Christmas before his dad (The Old Man) finds out.

Although billed as an "official sequel" in the trailer, the film is not directly based on Jean Shepherd's writings, instead relying on an original script by Nat Mauldin, who also narrates the movie in place of the late Shepherd (the subplot of Ralphie and his friends finding jobs and then getting fired was originally by Shepherd and had previously been included in the telefilm Ollie Hopnoodle's Haven of Bliss).

The film was released straight to DVD on October 30, 2012 to mostly negative reviews. 

Another sequel, which takes place 33 years after the events of the original film with most of its cast returning, entitled A Christmas Story Christmas, was released on November 17, 2022 on HBO Max and received generally better critical reception.

Plot
The film takes place in 1946, six years after the events of the original film. Ralphie is now fifteen years old, and all he wants is a used 1939 Mercury Eight convertible for Christmas. He tries testing the car out when he sees it on a display ramp, but he accidentally causes the car to roll back out of the used car lot and gently tap a light pole, causing a plastic reindeer to loosen and fall through the convertible top. Ralphie bands together with Flick and Schwartz to raise enough money to pay the dealer back for fixing it before Christmas so that the car dealer won't have Ralph arrested and presumably thrown in jail. He and his friends get a job and after going through several departments at the Higbee's store and in the end getting into a fight with the store Santa and then each other they all get fired. Ralphie does get his job back after some begging and pleading, but by Christmas Eve he finds he is still $1 short, so he and Flick rob Schwartz of his "lucky buck". While on the way to the dealer, Ralphie decides to donate a chunk for a less fortunate family. He winds up still off the hook with the owner of the dealership. In the end, he does get the car he wants for Christmas and the girlfriend he wants to go with it.

Cast
 Braeden Lemasters as Ralph "Ralphie" Parker
 Nat Mauldin as Ralph Parker/the Narrator
 Daniel Stern as Mr. Parker / The Old Man
 Stacey Travis as Mrs. Parker
 Valin Shinyei as Randy Parker
 David W. Thompson as Flick
 David Buehrle as Schwartz
 Tiera Skovbye as Drucilla Gootrad
 Gerard Plunkett as Hank Catenhauser
 Garry Chalk as Higbee's Store Santa
 Shawn Macdonald as Higbee's Assistant Manager

Production
The movie was filmed in New Westminster, British Columbia, Canada.

Release
The film was released straight to DVD on October 30, 2012.

In 2019, the film aired as part of the Best Christmas Ever block on AMC.

Critical reception
The film received mostly negative reviews. While being praised for attempts to portray 1940s-era America, much of the criticism was directed at the reliance of slapstick humor and its inferior derivation of the 1983 film. On review aggregator Rotten Tomatoes it has only three reviews from critics, all of them negative.

FleshEatingZipper panned the film, writing that the slapstick elements in the film detracted from the movie while praising the attempt to "replicate a 40s-era Midwest". Brian Orndorf of Blu-ray.com wrote: "Shamelessly derivative and plasticized, A Christmas Story 2 will only have you wondering why you're not watching the original picture again".

See also 
 List of Christmas films

References

External links
 

2012 films
2010s Christmas films
2010s Christmas comedy films
American Christmas comedy films
American sequel films
Direct-to-video sequel films
Alternative sequel films
Films directed by Brian Levant
Films set in 1946
Films set in Indiana
Films shot in British Columbia
Warner Bros. direct-to-video films
Films scored by David Newman
2012 comedy films
American children's comedy films
2010s English-language films
2010s American films